Parapheromia cassinoi is a species of geometrid moth in the family Geometridae. It is found in North America.

The MONA or Hodges number for Parapheromia cassinoi is 6608.

References

Further reading

External links

 

Boarmiini
Articles created by Qbugbot
Moths described in 1927